is a town located in Kamimashiki District, Kumamoto Prefecture, Japan.

As of February 2017, the town has an estimated population of 10,924 and a density of 190 persons per km². The total area is 57.87 km².

Geography

Climate
Kōsa has a humid subtropical climate (Köppen climate classification Cfa) with hot, humid summers and cool winters. There is significant precipitation throughout the year, especially during June and July.

Demographics
Per Japanese census data, the population of Kōsa in 2020 is 10,132 people. Kōsa has been conducting censuses since 1920.

References

External links

Kōsa official website 

Towns in Kumamoto Prefecture